Mihindukulasuriya Sunil Kaithan Fernando (22 September 1960 – 30 May 2017), popularly known as Sunil Mihindukula, was a Sri Lankan journalist, film critic and author. He was a permanent participant in various seminars, discussions, workshops island-wide on subjects such as cinema, literature, drama, and music.

Personal life
He was born on 22 September 1960 in Negombo, Sri Lanka as a member of a Catholic family. He completed his education at Maris Stella College, Negombo.

He was married to his longtime partner, Suraji Karunathilake, an information officer attached to the Information Department. The couple had four children.

He died on 30 May 2017 at the age of 56. His remains were laid at his residence at No. 950, Pethum Uyana, Rukmalgama. Cremation took place on 1 June 2017 at the Rukmalgama General Cemetery at 3 p.m.

Career
Since school times, he was a movie lover who was addicted to watching movies. After finishing school, he had the opportunity to associate with several media personalities such as Gunasiri Silva, Jayantha Chandrasiri and Prem Dissanayake. Then he started writing articles on the field of art for 'Navaliya' magazine edited by Jayantha Chandrasiri. He entered film journalism in 1978 with his first article to the ‘Sakura’ Magazine edited by Gunasiri Silva. He worked for some time with Gunasiri as a journalist for his publications and later contributed to 'Vichithra' publications compiled by Prem Dissanayake in 1987. He joined the Lankadeepa newspaper in 1979 as a feature writer. In the same year, he joined the political national newspaper 'Sathdina' where he discussed and wrote articles on literature. Meanwhile, Sunil also joined the film newspaper 'Piyakaru' after the invitation from its editor, Wimalendra Wathuregama. There Mihindukula made a concerted critique of the film trilogy.

He also wrote articles for magazines such as 'Sinesith' which were popular among texts at that time as a freelance journalist. In 1981, he reviewed Sugathapala Senarath Yapa's film Induta Mal Mitak for 'Lankadeepa', which was his first film review. In the same year, he joined as the staff writer for the editorial of 'Desathiya' published by the Government Information Department. In 1984, he wrote articles for the periodicals 'Kalpana' and 'Peramaga'.

In 1988, he joined the film newspaper 'Kala'. Feeling the need for a permanent job, he joined the 'Ravaya' newspaper in 1990, edited by Victor Ivan as the editor of the cinema page. In 1991, he held the post of Publication Assistant at the Social and Peace Center. He joined the Udaya Tennakoon's 'Thira Tharu' in 1990 and the film newspaper 'Rasa' edited by Ernest Waduge in 1994 and worked as a film writer. Sunil then joined Associated Newspapers of Ceylon Limited (also called Lake House or ANCL) as a full-time journalist in the mid-90s and was appointed as a sub-editor of 'Dinamina' newspaper in 1995. Then he became the deputy editor of the 'Sarasaviya' newspaper. After a short stint, he became the chief editor of 'Sarasaviya' in 2009. During his tenure, he made several changes to the newspaper by creating supplements for areas such as literature, stage drama, and music.

While holding that position, in 2007, he joined Silumina as the editor of the 'Rasaduna' tabloid anthology published with the 'Silumina' weekend newspaper compiled by a veteran journalist Dharmasiri Gamage. His column 'Paryalokaya' written for the Silumina Literary Supplement was also talked about drama. For more than a decade, Sunil has been able to compile 'Rasaduna' with its unique content and corresponding style. At the same time, he became the co-editor of 'Silumina'. At the invitation of 'Sarasaviya' editor Aruna Gunaratne, He started writing a series of articles entitled 'Dramatists and Their Creations' in mid-2016. He worked at Lake House until his retirement in 2016.

As a film critic, he was also a board member of the Film Jury in several film festivals and was a member of the Arts Sub-Committee under the Department of Culture, and a member of the Teledrama Pre-Monitoring Board. He was also the editor of the film magazine 'Sadisi' published by the Sri Lanka Film Corporation. Over four decades, more than 1000 articles have been written in various newspapers on the subject of Sinhala cinema and other fields of art. Following his retirement from journalism, a series of articles entitled 'Natyakaruwo Saha Owunge Nirmana' was published weekly at the 'Sarasaviya' in 2016. He was also honored with Presidential Cinema award for his service to cinema and journalism at Presidential Film Festival. On 29 December 2005, he won the Cyril B. Perera Memorial Cinema Literary Award at the SIGNIS award ceremony held at the Elphinstone Theatre, Colombo 10.

Apart from a journalist career, he was a prolific author. His bibliography is also a successful process that spans a wide range of disciplines. He wrote his first book in 1989 based on 'Rukmani Devi Niliya Gayikawa Ha Janapriya Sanskruthiya'. Then in 1991, he wrote the critical review on the film 'Thun Man Handiya' directed by Mahagama Sekara. In 1997, he published three books: 'Minerva Theater Group', 'Kadawunu Poronduwa' and 'Lester James Pieris Sinhala Cinemawe Jayakodi Lakuna'. He also made a film review on fellow film critic Jayawilal Wilegoda. In 2010, he launched the book 'Cinema Sanskruthika Pragnaya' on Tissa Abeysekara. Then he wrote the reviews and critics of 'Sinhala Cinema Sihiawatana', 'Cinemawata Hedinweemak', 'Sri Lankeya Demala Bhashitha Cinemawa', 'Indeeya Cinemawe Dahathunweni Bhashawa', 'Uththama Purusha Eka Wachana', and 'Sinhala Cinemawe Arbudha'.

In 2012, he authored a book, "Picture Pissa". In 2017, he wrote 22 books, 17 of which are books on cinema. The books cover a wide range of topics, including film data, filmmakers' subject information, and film reviews. Two of his other books were devoted to the art of drama, and the other was nourished by substantial columns he wrote for various newspapers. His last book is 'Ranjith Dharmakeerthi Natyavalokanaya'. However, the book was launched in September 2020 after his death which was edited by Edward Chandrasiri.

He has also received the Cine Media Vision Film Writing Award. At the Raigam Tele'es, Sunil was honored with a Special Merit Award at the Raigam Tele'es Awards for his screenplay for Roopawalokanaya National Television. On 4 May 2017, Sunil was felicitated for his service to cinema and cinema literature at the auditorium of the Mass Media Ministry. During the event, a book titled 'Sunil Mihindukula Cinema Sahithya Sampradana' edited by Prof. Samantha Herath and well-known writer and poet Buddadasa Galappatti was released.

Author works
 Rukmani Devi Niliya Gayikawa Ha Janapriya Sanskruthiya
 Thunman Handiya Vicharaya'
 Minerva Theater Group Kadawunu Poronduwa Vicharaya Lester James Pieris Sinhala Cinemawe Jayakodi Lakuna Jayawilal Wilegoda Cinema Wichara Cinema Sanskruthika Pragnaya Sinhala Cinema Sihiawatana Cinemawata Hedinweemak Sri Lankeya Demala Bhashitha Cinemawa Indeeya Cinemawe Dahathunweni Bhashawa Uththama Purusha Eka Wachana Paryaloka 
 Sinhala Cinemawe Arbudha Ranjith Dharmakeerthi Natyavalokanaya''

References

1960 births
2017 deaths
Sri Lankan Buddhists
Sri Lankan journalists
Sri Lankan film people
Alumni of Maris Stella College